The 1992 Winter Olympics, officially known by the International Olympic Committee as the XVI Olympic Winter Games, were a multi-sport event held in Albertville, France, from February 8 through February 23, 1992. A total of 1,801 athletes representing 64 National Olympic Committees (NOCs) participated at the Games in 57 events across 12 disciplines.

Two disciplines were contested for medals for the first time after being demonstration sports four years prior in Calgary: freestyle skiing and short track speed skating.  In addition, the first women's events were held in biathlon and a pursuit event was added in cross-country skiing for both men and women.

Following the late-1991 dissolution of the Soviet Union, six of the newly independent countries participated together as the Unified Team, the only Winter Olympics at which they would do so.  The three Baltic states of Estonia, Latvia, and Lithuania chose to compete independently from the Unified Team.  The republics of Croatia and Slovenia made their Olympic debuts, being newly independent from Yugoslavia.  Following German reunification, the combined Federal Republic of Germany was represented by one combined team.

Germany was the most successful team at these Olympics, winning 10 gold medals out of 26 total; both were the most of any nation.  The Unified Team came in second in both tallies, with 9 golds and 23 total medals – Norway tied the Unified Team with 9 golds, but had only 20 total medals.  New Zealand's Annelise Coberger won the country's first Winter Olympics medal, the first by someone representing a Southern Hemisphere nation.  Lyubov Yegorova was the most successful athlete, with five medals: three golds and two silvers.  Her teammate on the Unified Team and fellow cross-country skier Yelena Välbe also won five medals; she had one gold and four bronze medals.  Thirty-eight athletes won more than one medal in Albertville, and twenty NOCs won at least one medal.

Alpine skiing

Biathlon

Bobsleigh

Cross-country skiing

Figure skating

Freestyle skiing

Ice hockey

Luge

Nordic combined

Short track speed skating

Ski jumping

Speed skating

Multiple medalists

Athletes who won three or more medals during the 1992 Winter Olympics are listed below.

Notes
 No bronze medal was awarded in this event because two competitors tied for the silver medal with a time of 2 minutes and 13.71 seconds.

See also
 1992 Winter Olympics medal table

References

External links

Medal winners
Olympic
Lists of Winter Olympic medalists by year